Schönwald is a municipality in the district of Dahme-Spreewald in Brandenburg in Germany.

History
The present Schönwald as an entity was created from the voluntary merger of two previously independent municipalities, Schönwalde (Lower Sorbian Běły Gózd) und Waldow-Brand. Today it is in the jurisdiction of the district of Unterspreewald, the seat of which is itself in Schönwald.

Demography

References

Localities in Dahme-Spreewald